The following people are associated with New Canaan, Connecticut and notable far beyond it (including those who were born in, raised in, lived in, worked in, or died in town):

Actors, directors, producers

 Tony Goldwyn, actor, Scandal
 Katherine Heigl, actress
 Christopher Lloyd, actor
 Michael McCusker, film editor
 Christopher Meloni, actor, Law & Order SVU
 Martin Mull (born 1943), actor and comedian
 Sarah Rafferty, actor, known for Suits
 Allison Williams, actor, Girls

Musicians

 Liona Boyd, classical guitarist and composer 
 Edie Brickell, singer, wife of Paul Simon
 Harry Connick Jr., singer
 Merrill Garbus, founder of Indie-Pop band Tune-Yards
 Stephen Jenks (1772–1856), composer, teacher, and tunebook compiler 
 Paul Simon, singer-songwriter, husband of Edie Brickell

Athletes and those in the sports industry

 Zach Allen, current defensive end for the Arizona Cardinals
 Curt Casali (born 1988), current baseball catcher for the San Francisco Giants
 Dave Eichelberger, Jr. (born 1943),  professional golfer 
 Terry Hanratty, NFL quarterback 1969–1976 for the Pittsburgh Steelers and Tampa Bay Buccaneers
 Pierre McGuire (born 1961), ice hockey analyst, former NHL coach and scout
 George H. Morris (born 1938), equestrian
 Lucas Niang, current offensive lineman for the Kansas City Chiefs
 Elmer Oliphant (1892–1975), football player
 Max Pacioretty (born 1988), NHL player for the Carolina Hurricanes
 Doug Perlman, sports media executive
 Bill Toomey, 1968 Olympic decathlon champion 
 Christopher "Mad Dog" Russo, sports talk-show personality on WFAN radio
 Fay Vincent, eighth commissioner of Major League Baseball 1989–1992

Journalists

 Glenn Beck, television and radio commentator
 Ann Coulter, commentator
 Ann Curry, former co-host of NBC's Today
 Buzz Kanter, motorcycle magazine publisher (American Iron Magazine, Garage Build)
 Armen Keteyian (born 1953), television reporter 
 Mike Wallace, 60 Minutes correspondent
 Brian Williams, former anchor of NBC Nightly News and former host of The 11th Hour with Brian Williams
 Sid Yudain, founder of Roll Call

Authors, writers
(not including journalists)

 Bliss Carman, Canadian poet 
 A. J. Cronin, Scottish novelist 
 Peter D'Adamo, naturopathic physician and author 
 Jack Douglas, writer 
 Phoebe Dunn, author and photographer of children's books 
 Edward Eager, children's author and playwright
 Gerald Green (1922–2006), author
 Fran Lebowitz, writer and humorist 
 Rick Moody, author of The Ice Storm 
 Maxwell Perkins (1884–1947), editor of F. Scott Fitzgerald and Thomas Wolfe 
 Armstrong Sperry, Newbery Medal-winning author of Call It Courage
 Peter von Ziegesar, writer and memoirist
 Douglas Marland, soap opera writer

Artists, architects, designers

 Solon Borglum, sculptor
 Roland Crandall, early animator
 Philip C. Johnson (1906–2005), architect who built and lived in the famous Glass House in town
 Eliot Noyes, architect and industrial designer for IBM
 Glenora Richards, miniature painter and postage stamp designer
 Arthur Szyk, anti-Nazi cartoonist and book illustrator; artist

Government

 Chris Dodd, U.S. Senator for Connecticut
 Stuart Symington, U.S. Senator for Missouri and Secretary of the Air Force
 Walter Childs Wood (1864–1953), state legislator and retired surgeon

Business

 Rich Barton, CEO of Zillow Group and founder of Expedia
 Dave Checketts, former CEO of Madison Square Garden 
 Gary Crittenden, CFO of Citigroup 
 Jeff Immelt, CEO of General Electric
 Nigel MacEwan, former CEO of Kleinwort Benson North America; former President of Merrill Lynch
 Erika Nardini, CEO of Barstool Sports
 David Neeleman, CEO of JetBlue Airways 
 Rich Riley, CEO of Shazam
 Stephen S. Roach, economist and senior fellow at Yale University

Other

 Emily Barringer (1876–1961), physician; first female ambulance surgeon 
 H. Keith H. Brodie, former Duke University president
 Anthony Comstock Christian activist and reactionary, namesake of Comstock laws
 Marion Dickerman, with her lover Nancy Cook, suffragists
 Kathy Giusti, founder of the Multiple Myeloma Foundation
 Henry Hanford (1784–1866), first Euro-American settler of Lewistown, Ohio

See also
 List of people from Connecticut
 List of people from Bridgeport, Connecticut
 List of people from Brookfield, Connecticut
 List of people from Darien, Connecticut
 List of people from Greenwich, Connecticut
 List of people from Hartford, Connecticut
 List of people from New Haven, Connecticut
 List of people from Norwalk, Connecticut
 List of people from Redding, Connecticut
 List of people from Ridgefield, Connecticut
 List of people from Stamford, Connecticut
 List of people from Westport, Connecticut

Notes

People from New Canaan
People from New Canaan, Connecticut
New Canaan Connecticut